Peter DePoe (born August 21, 1943), also known as Last Walking Bear, is an American rock musician who is perhaps best known as the drummer for the Native American band Redbone. Born in Neah Bay, Washington in 1943, his tribal Ancestors are Southern Cheyenne, Turtle Mountain Chippewa, and Rogue River/Siletz. DePoe is also of French and German descent. He first played with Jimi Hendrix in Seattle's local taverns as a young man and then moved to California and became Redbone's drummer in 1969. 

He was credited with developing a style of drumming known as "King Kong", later copied by other drummers for its versatile and funk-oriented rhythms.

In early 1972, he left the group. The band replaced him with Arturo Perez, and then with Redbone bandmate Tony Bellamy's Filipino-Mexican American cousin, Butch Rillera.

Further reading 
"Come And Get Your Love: A Celebratory Ode to Redbone (1939-Present)" by Pat “Redbone” Vegas. Jim Hoffmann, contributor. Rehbon Publishing, 2017, 280 pps.
 "King Kong Pete: Redbone and Beyond" by Peter "Last Walking Bear" DePoe. Jim Hoffmann, contributor. King Kong Beat Publishing, 2017, 292 pps.

Discography

Ron Buford - Deep Soul Pt. 1 & 2 - Camelot Studios - 1962
Mr. Clean and the Cleansers - 1964
Jimmy McCracklin - The Stinger Man (LP, Album) Minit LP-24017 1969
Redbone - Potlatch Epic 1970
Redbone - Redbone Epic 1970
Redbone - Message From A Drum Epic 1971
Power (Prelude To A Means) (as Peter O. DePoe) 
Redbone - Already Here (LP, Album) Epic, Epic, Epic EPC 65072, S EPC 65072, KE 31598 1972
Trafton - Traffic Jam (CD, Album) Rose Records (2), Rose Records (2) #208, ROSE208 1990
Take It Easy Various - WTNG 89.9 FM: Solid Bronze (LP, Comp, Ltd) Numero Group, Numbero NBR-002 2012
Bobby Womack - Across 110th Street - EMI- 1972
Redbone - Wovoka Epic 1973
Redbone - Come And Get Your Redbone / The Best Of Redbone Epic 1975
Jimmy Ford - Harlan County (Sundown/White Whale Records JHS-1002), 1969
Brenda Patterson - Keep On Keepin On 1970 - Epic Records

Writing & Arrangement:
Things Go Better... (as P. DePoe) 
23rd And Mad (as P. DePoe) 
Intro for Chant 13th Hour - Redbone
Cisco's Ride Home (as P. DePoe)

References

External links
 Official Redbone website
 Orexis on Redbone

People from Neah Bay, Washington
Native American musicians
American rock drummers
Musicians from Washington (state)
1943 births
Living people
Cheyenne people
20th-century American drummers
American male drummers
20th-century American male musicians
Redbone (band) members